The 1977 FIBA Intercontinental Cup William Jones was the 11th edition of the FIBA Intercontinental Cup for men's basketball clubs. It took place at Madrid. From the FIBA European Champions Cup participated Real Madrid as host club and title holder, Mobilgirgi Varèse, and Maccabi Elite as European Champions. From the South American Club Championship participated Atlética Francana.

Dragones de Tijuana took part from the Mexican Basketball Circuit, and from the Division I (NCAA) participated the Providence Friars.

Participants

League stage
Day 1, October 4 1977

|}

Day 2, October 5 1977

|}

Day 3, October 6 1977

|}

Day 4, October 7 1977

|}

Day 5, October 8 1977

|}

Final standings

Awards

Europe's Five
 Juan Antonio Corbalán - ( Real Madrid)
 Wayne Brabender - ( Real Madrid)
 Walter Szczerbiak Sr. - ( Real Madrid)
 Bob Morse - ( Mobilgirgi Varèse)
 Aulcie Perry - ( Maccabi Elite)

America's Five
 Dwight Williams - ( Providence Friars)
 Paul McCracken - ( Dragones de Tijuana)
 Arturo Guerrero - ( Dragones de Tijuana)
 Bruce Campbell - ( Providence Friars)
 Adilson de Freitas - ( Atlética Francana)

MVP

 Walter Szczerbiak Sr. - ( Real Madrid)

References

External links
 1977 Intercontinental Cup William Jones

1977
1977–78 in European basketball
1977–78 in Spanish basketball
1977–78 in South American basketball
1977–78 in American college basketball
International basketball competitions hosted by Spain